The American Association for Public Opinion Research (AAPOR) is a professional organization of more than 2,000 public opinion and survey research professionals in the United States and from around the world, with members from academia, media, government, the non-profit sector and private industry. AAPOR publishes three academic journals:  Public Opinion Quarterly, Survey Practice and the Journal for Survey Statistics and Methodology. It holds an annual research conference and maintains a "Code of Professional Ethics and Practices", for survey research which all members agree to follow. The association's founders include pioneering pollsters Archibald Crossley, George Gallup, and Elmo Roper.

AAPOR's stated principle is that public opinion research is essential to a healthy democracy, providing information crucial to informed policy-making and giving voice to people's beliefs, attitudes and desires. Through its annual conference, standards and ethics codes and publications, AAPOR seeks to promote a better public understanding of the role of public opinion research in a democracy, as well as the sound and ethical conduct and use of public opinion research.

Standards and ethics

Promoting standards and ethics is central AAPOR's mission. The individuals who are members of AAPOR agree to observe the organization's Code of Professional Ethics and Practices that define and mandate the proper practice of public opinion and survey research with the appropriate use of research results. The Code is designed to express fundamental principles that apply to the conduct of research regardless of an individual's membership in AAPOR.  Adherence to the principles and actions set out in the Code is possible for of all public opinion and survey researchers, whether they are AAPOR members or not.

Under the Code, practitioners of survey research are expected to conduct their research with care, taking all reasonable steps to assure the reliability and validity of the results and communicate their methods and findings accurately with appropriate detail.  The AAPOR code details the standards for dealing with research participants and identifiable information.  And it indicates the need to provide clients with all information regarding possible research limitations and the need for disclosure.

The latest revision was approved in May 2015.

Transparency Initiative

In October 2014, AAPOR launched the Transparency Initiative (TI) to encourage research organizations to disclose their methodological procedures fully and rigorously when reporting survey-based findings. AAPOR established a set of principles for disclosure and then invited organizations to apply to join the TI effort and be recognized for their promise to comply with the guidelines. Joining the TI does not imply any judgment about the quality or rigor of the methods being disclosed. The purpose of TI is to promote understanding of the relationship between methodology and survey quality, increase adherence to AAPOR's Code of Professional Ethics and Practices and enable members of the media and the public to evaluate survey quality.

Presidents

The AAPOR Awards 
Each year, AAPOR presents a portfolio of awards to recognize distinguished work in the profession, as well as to further the education of students and early career researchers; these awards are the highest honors given by the AAPOR.

Reports
As needed, AAPOR may commission a working group to address topical issues relating to the survey research industry. These working groups produce reports to introduce new methods, address methodological concerns or provide guidance on the application of specific research methods. Here are some of those Task Force Reports:

 January 1, 2008 – Pre-Election Polling in New Hampshire: What Went Wrong?
 April, 2008 – AAPOR Cell Phone Task Force Report
 March 30, 2009 – An Evaluation of the Methodology of the 2008 Pre-Election Primary Polls: Report of ad hoc AAPOR Committee on the 2008 Presidential Primary Polling
 May 16, 2009 – Report to the AAPOR Standards Committee on the status of Human Subjects Protection Training Requirements
 March 24, 2010 – AAPOR Opt In Online Panel Task Force Report
 October 28, 2010 – AAPOR 2010 Cell Phone Task Force Report
 October 7, 2012 – AAPOR Statement on Understanding a "credibility interval"
 May 17, 2013 – AAPOR Report on Non-Probability Sampling
 September 2, 2013 – Polling and Democracy: Report of the AAPOR Task Force on Public Opinion and Leadership
 May 12, 2014 – Mobile Technologies for Conducting, Augmenting and Potentially Replacing Surveys: Report of the AAPOR Task Force on Emerging Technologies in Public Opinion Research
 May 30, 2014 – Social Media and Public Opinion Research: Report of the AAPOR Task Force on Emerging Technologies in Public Opinion Research
 September 8, 2014 – Current Knowledge and Considerations Regarding Survey Refusals
 February 12, 2015 Task Force Report on Big Data

See also
 Council of American Survey Research Organizations
 European Society for Opinion and Marketing Research
 Survey methodology
 World Association for Public Opinion Research

References

External links
 

Professional associations based in the United States
Quantitative research
Statistical organizations in the United States
Organizations established in 1947
1947 establishments in the United States
Public opinion research companies in the United States